Brockley Hall Stables is a 0.065 hectare biological Site of Special Scientific Interest near the village of Brockley, North Somerset, England notified in 1987.

Biological Interest
The SSSI designation applies to part of the former stable block of Brockley Hall, the roofspace of which hosts a large breeding  colony of greater horseshoe bats during summer.

Sources
 English Nature citation sheet for the site  (accessed 9 July 2006)

Sites of Special Scientific Interest in North Somerset
Sites of Special Scientific Interest notified in 1987
Stables